West Port High School is an American high school in Ocala, Florida and one of eight public high schools in Marion County. Founded in 2000 and constructed at 3733 SW 80th Avenue, West Port is the district high school for West Ocala. The campus formerly housed both West Port Middle and High Schools. The middle school relocated in 2008, after Liberty Middle School was built. As of the 2019–2020 school year, there were about 2,681 students attending West Port High School, making it the largest school, by population, in the district. West Port also has the largest campus by area.

Notable alumni
Jason Schappert, aviator
Jonnu Smith, NFL tight end for the New England Patriots
 David Rau, former Wage War drummer and current teacher at the school.

References

External links 
 West Port High School website
 Marion County Public Schools website
 Ocala Star-Banner newspaper article about the MCCA program

Buildings and structures in Ocala, Florida
High schools in Marion County, Florida
Public high schools in Florida
Educational institutions established in 2000
2000 establishments in Florida